Guinier is a surname. Notable people with the surname include:

 André Guinier (1911–2000), French physicist
 Henri Guinier (1867–1927), French portrait and landscape painter
 Lani Guinier (1950–2022), American civil rights theorist
 Philibert Guinier (1876–1962), French botanist